Petar Popović (born 27 July 1982) is a former Serbian tennis player.

Popović has a career high ATP singles ranking of 411 achieved on 29 August 2005. He also has a career high ATP doubles ranking of 266 achieved on 24 July 2006.

Popović has 1 ATP Challenger Tour title at the 2005 Samarkand Challenger.

References

External links

1982 births
Living people
Serbian male tennis players
Serbian tennis coaches
Sportspeople from Novi Sad